The Abbeydale miniature railway is a railway run by the Sheffield & District Society of Model & Experimental Engineers Ltd. in Ecclesall Woods in south-west Sheffield, South Yorkshire, England.

The society owns several locomotives with a tinkerbell type steam locomotive named 'Septimus' and a diesel locomotive named 'Edward' on the ground level. There are also two electric locomotives named 'Merlin' and 'Vulcan' also owned by the society for use on the raised track.

See also 
 List of ridable miniature railways

References 

Rail transport modelling associations
7¼ in gauge railways